Rendy Rining Robson (born 5 March 1993) is a Malaysian professional footballer who plays as a goalkeeper for Malaysia Super League club Penang.

Before UiTM, Rendy played for home state team Sabah F.C.

Honour
Sabah
Malaysia Premier League: 2019

References

External links

1993 births
Living people
Malaysian footballers
People from Sabah
Sabah F.C. (Malaysia) players
UiTM FC players
Penang F.C. players
Association football goalkeepers
Malaysia Super League players